Eisen  is a German surname meaning "iron". Notable people with the surname include:

Arnold Eisen, professor of Jewish studies
Arthur Arturovich Eisen, a Russian soloist with the Alexandrov Ensemble
Charles-Dominique-Joseph Eisen (1720–1778), French painter and engraver
Cliff Eisen, Canadian musicologist
Erez Eisen, Israeli music producer
François Eisen. French engraver
Gary Eisen, American politician
Gustav Eisen, Swedish-American scientist
Hilda Eisen, Polish-born American businessperson, philanthropist, and Holocaust survivor
Jonathan Eisen, American biologist
Matthias Johann Eisen, Estonian folklorist
Michael Eisen, American biologist
Norm Eisen, American lawyer and diplomat
Percy A. Eisen, American architect
Rich Eisen, American television journalist
Sara Eisen, American television journalist
Stanley Bert "Paul Stanley" Eisen, American musician
Theodore Eisen, American architect
Thelma "Tiby" Eisen (1922-2014), American baseball player
Tripp Eisen, American musician
Zach Tyler Eisen, American voice actor

Eisen is also a masculine Japanese given name. Notable people with the name include:
, Japanese ukiyo-e artist
, Japanese potter

See also
Aizen (disambiguation)
Eisenmann
 
 
 
 

German-language surnames
Jewish surnames
Japanese masculine given names